St. Christopher's Hospice is a hospice in south London, England, established in 1967 by Cicely Saunders, whose work is considered the basis of modern hospice philosophy.

Legacy
Among the first staff at St. Christopher's was Florence Wald, who took Saunders' philosophies back to the United States to become the founder of the hospice movement in the United States. In 1971 Robert Twycross was appointed as a Clinical Research Fellow by  Saunders. During his tenure there, his studies on the effectiveness of morphine, diamorphine and methadone helped standardize and simplify the management of cancer pain.

Features
The hospice contains sculptures by the Polish artist Witold Gracjan Kawalec.

References

External links
Official site

Hospices in England
Charities based in London
Health in London
1967 establishments in England